Albert Taylor Emptage (26 December 1917 – 1997) was an English footballer who played as a wing half. Born in Grimsby in 1917, he played for Manchester City between 1938 and 1950. He made his debut in a 4–1 win against Leicester City on 15 January 1938. He appeared 136 times in the League and scored 1 goal. He also played for Scunthorpe United and Stockport County.

He later worked as a trainer at Rochdale.

References

External links

Rootsweb entry

1917 births
1997 deaths
English footballers
Footballers from Grimsby
Manchester City F.C. players
Scunthorpe United F.C. players
Stockport County F.C. players
Association football wing halves
Rochdale A.F.C. non-playing staff
English Football League players
English Football League representative players